The  was an influential Pan-Asianist group and secret society active in the Empire of Japan, and was considered to be an ultranationalist group by General Headquarters in the International Military Tribunal for the Far East.

Foundation as the Koyōsha
Founded as the Koyōsha by Hiraoka Kotarō (1851–1906), a wealthy ex-samurai and mine-owner, with mining interests in Manchuria, Tōyama Mitsuru, and other former samurai of the Fukuoka Domain, it agitated for a return to the old feudal Japanese order with special privileges and government stipends for the samurai class. The Koyōsha participated in the various ex-samurai uprisings in Kyūshū against the early Meiji government, but after the suppression of the Satsuma Rebellion in 1877, it abandoned its original goals, joined the pro-democracy Freedom and People's Rights Movement, and formed a political organization to agitate for a national parliament instead.

Foundation as the Gen'yōsha

In 1881, the Koyōsha changed its direction again. This time, the declared aims of the Gen'yōsha were "to honor the Imperial Family, respect the Empire and to guard the rights of the people". However, its true agenda was to agitate for Japanese military expansion and conquest of the Asian continent.  The true agenda was reflected in its new name of Gen'yōsha, taken after the Genkainada strait which separates Japan from Korea.

The tactics which the Gen'yōsha was prepared to use to achieve its goals were also far from peaceful. It began as a terrorist organization, and although it continued to recruit disaffected ex-samurai, it also attracted figures involved in organized crime to assist in its campaigns of violence and assassination against foreigners and liberal politicians.

In 1889, the Gen'yōsha strongly criticized the unequal treaty revision plan drafted by foreign minister Ōkuma Shigenobu. A Gen'yōsha member threw a bomb which wounded him severely. In the election of 1892, the Gen'yōsha mounted a campaign of intimidation and violence with the tacit support of the Matsukata administration to influence the outcome of the election.

One of the primary targets of the Gen'yōsha were the many Chinese secret societies, some of which were very hostile to Japan. However, the Chinese secret societies had a shared goal with the Gen'yōsha in wanting the overthrow of the Qing dynasty. In 1881, Mitsuru Tōyama sent over 100 men into China to gather information and to infiltrate these secret societies. One of the first and most detailed histories of the secret societies was written by Gen'yōsha member Hiraya Amane, who assisted in the establishment of the Gen'yōsha's Chinese headquarters in Hangzhou.

The Gen'yōsha not only provided funds and weapons to the secret societies, but also arranged for refuge in Japan for leaders targeted by the Qing government. The Gen'yosha established a large network of brothels across China (and later throughout Southeast Asia) to provide meeting locations, and also to gather information. In addition to being a profitable side-business, the brothels provided opportunities to gather useful information for the later blackmail or subversion of patrons. However, although blackmail and bribery were often resorted to, more often information was obtained by employing prostitutes highly skilled in extracting information from their clients. The Gen'yōsha even established a training school for such agents in Sapporo in Hokkaidō.

Another sphere of Gen'yōsha activity was Korea. The Gen'yōsha established a task force to prepare detailed topographical survey maps of Korea in secret, in anticipation of a future Japanese invasion. The Gen'yōsha also actively supported the Donghak Peasant Movement, knowing that the uprising was likely to draw China and Japan into a war. The assassination of Queen Min of Korea in 1895 is believed to have been conducted by Gen'yosha members, at the instigation of the Japanese Minister in Seoul, Miura Gorō.

Originally ignored by the Japanese military, during the First Sino-Japanese War and Russo-Japanese War, both the Imperial Japanese Army and Imperial Japanese Navy found the Gen'yōshas extensive intelligence gathering network throughout East Asia to be invaluable. The Gen'yōsha network was also useful for the military in conducting sabotage activities behind enemy lines.

After the annexation of Korea in 1910, the Gen'yōsha continued to support efforts towards Pan-Asianism. Domestically, it formed a political party called the Dai Nippon Seisantō ("Greater Japan Production Party") to combat the influence of socialism in worker trade unions.

Towards its later years, the Gen'yōsha was far removed from its origins as a secret society, but had evolved almost to the mainstream of Japanese politics. A number of cabinet ministers and members of the Japanese Diet were known members, and mainstream political leaders, such as Hirota Kōki and Nakano Seigō emerged from its ranks. It continued to exert considerable influence on the politics and foreign policy of Japan until the end of World War II.

The Gen'yōsha was disbanded by the American authorities during the Occupation of Japan.

Legacy
The Gen'yōsha was the forerunner of a number of organizations which inherited and developed its ideology. It also set the stage for the post-World War II ties between right-wing politicians and yakuza organized crime syndicates.

Although modern yakuza share many of Gen'yōsha's political and social philosophies, and although many of Gen'yōsha's members were drawn from yakuza ranks, the Gen'yōsha was primarily a political organization that often used criminal means to attain its goals, and was not a yakuza itself, as some authors have claimed.

See also
Black Dragon Society

References

Notes

External links
 

Politics of the Empire of Japan
Japanese militarism
1879 establishments in Japan
Meiji Restoration
Japanese secret societies
Secret societies related to organized crime
Far-right politics in Japan
Pan-Asianism